Coweta High School is a public school located in Coweta, Oklahoma, United States, and is accredited by the Oklahoma State Board of Education and the North Central Association of Secondary Schools. This school services grades ten through twelve with approximately 700 students in attendance.

With the core subjects Coweta High School also has elective classes that range from Art to Video Production. Students attending Coweta High school also have the opportunity to go to vocational training through Indian Capital Technology Center in Muskogee, Oklahoma.

Extracurricular activities

Athletics
The Coweta Tigers have won 10 state championships in their history as recognized by the Oklahoma Secondary Schools Athletic Association.

The following is a list of the sports in which the school competes and the years, if any, during which the school's team won the state championship:

Baseball - 1 (1999)
Boys Basketball - 0
Girls Basketball - 0
Cheerleading - 0
Boys Cross Country - 0
Girls Cross Country - 2 (2010, 2011)
Football - 0
Boys Golf - 0
Girls Golf - 1 (1999)
Marching Band - 10
Boys Soccer - 0 
Girls Soccer - 0 
Softball - 3 (2002, 2004, 2005)
Boys Track - 0
Girls Track - 0
Volleyball - 0
Wrestling - 3 (Team State: 1985, 1993) (Dual State: 2016)

See also
 Coweta Public Schools

References

External links
 
 GreatestSchools overview

Public high schools in Oklahoma
Schools in Wagoner County, Oklahoma
Coweta, Oklahoma